The Keck Homestead, near Del Norte, Colorado, was homesteaded in 1876.    It includes four log buildings built by Christian Keck and his sons, at a high altitude.

It was listed on the National Register of Historic Places in 1988.

The house is a two-story L-shaped building on a dry stone foundation.

References

Log buildings and structures on the National Register of Historic Places in Colorado
National Register of Historic Places in Rio Grande County, Colorado